Holz [holts] is a German surname meaning wood or timber, and may refer to:

 Arno Holz (1863–1929), German poet and dramatist
 Betty W. Holz (1919–2005), American mathematician
 George Holz, American photographer
 Joshua Holz, creator of the 2016 Damn Daniel internet meme
 Justa Holz-Mänttäri, translation scholar
 Karl Holz (executive) (born 1952), current chairman and CEO of Euro Disney SCA
 Karl Holz (Gauleiter) (1895–1945), German Nazi NSDAP Gauleiter of Franconia and SA Gruppenführer
 Karl Holz (violinist) (1798–1858), Austrian violinist and friend of Beethoven
 Richard E. Holz (1914–1986), American brass band composer

Other uses
 Short for Holzblasinstrumente, see woodwinds

See also 
 Holt (disambiguation)
 Holtz
 Holzer

German-language surnames
Jewish surnames